The coat of arms of Słupsk shows the red griffin of the Duchy of Pomerania above a stylised representation of three waves, indicating the three streams of the Słupia River as it flows through Słupsk. The city has used this device or a variant of it since the 14th century.

References

Further reading

Plewako, A. and Wanag, J. (1994): Herbarz Miast Polskich. Arkady: Warsaw.

Słupsk
Slupsk
Slupsk